Dual specificity protein phosphatase CDC14A is an enzyme that in humans is encoded by the CDC14A gene.

The protein encoded by this gene is a member of the dual specificity protein tyrosine phosphatase family. This protein is highly similar to Saccharomyces cerevisiae Cdc14, a protein tyrosine phosphatase involved in the exit of cell mitosis and initiation of DNA replication, which suggests the role in cell cycle control. This protein has been shown to interact with and dephosphorylates tumor suppressor protein p53, and is thought to regulate the function of p53. Alternative splice of this gene results in 3 transcript variants encoding distinct isoforms.

Interactions
CDC14A has been shown to interact with P53, de-phosphorylate p53 at Serine 315 and thereby stabilize p53.  S315-phosphorylated p53, in contrast to other p53 phosphorylation, was shown to facilitate p53 degradation.

References

External links

Further reading